United Nations Security Council resolution 799, adopted unanimously on 18 December 1992, after reaffirming resolutions 607 (1988), 608 (1990), 636 (1989), 641 (1989), 681 (1990), 694 (1991) and 726 (1992) and learning of the deportation of hundreds of Palestinians by Israel in the occupied territories on 17 December 1992, the Council condemned the deportations that were in violation of the Fourth Geneva Convention referring to the protection of civilians in times of war.

The resolution deplored the action and reiterated that Israel should refrain from deporting any more Palestinians and ensure the safe and immediate return of those deported.

See also
 Arab–Israeli conflict
 First Intifada
 Israeli–Palestinian conflict
 List of United Nations Security Council Resolutions 701 to 800 (1991–1993)

References
Text of the Resolution at undocs.org

External links
 

 0799
 0799
1992 in Israel
Israeli–Palestinian conflict and the United Nations
December 1992 events